The Lake (みずうみ Mizūmi) is a 2015 novel by Banana Yoshimoto, translated into English by Michael Emmerich, and inspired by the infamous, real-life Aum Shinrikyo cult.

Plot
After her mother's death, Chihiro moves to Tokyo, where she sees a mysterious man, Nakajima, standing in the window of his home opposite hers, and watching her. Nakajima seems to have been a victim of a childhood trauma. Chihiro begins to fall in love with him but his dark past threatens to tear them apart.

Characters
Chihiro : Born to unmarried parents. Her father is a businessman and her mother is the owner of a bar. She is a graphic artist.
Nakajima : A mysterious man with a dark troubled past involved with the Lake.
Mino : Nakajima's friend, brother to bed-ridden seer Chii. He acts as Chii's mouthpiece.
Chii: a bed-ridden seer who is barely conscious; sister of Mino with whom she communicates telepathically.

References

External links
The Lake at Goodreads

2005 Japanese novels
Novels by Banana Yoshimoto